While most anime have multiple albums released, Suzuka only has three. Each album has hours of background music (BGM), as well as vocals.  All BGM were composed by Masanori Takumi, but the openings and endings were performed by COACH☆.

Original Soundtracks (OSTs)

OST 1
Suzuka Character Song Collection & Original Soundtrack Music Field 1
The first Suzuka OST to be released, it contained many original vocals by Tonbow and Tapiko, the lyricists, and Masanori Takumi.  This album actually included a DVD as well, featuring COACH☆ performing "Start Line."  It was released on September 22, 2005 by King's Records.

KICA-714

OST 2
Suzuka Character Song Collection & Original Soundtrack Music Field 2
This second OST complete with a character song collection was released on November 23, 2005, also by King's Records.

KICA-735

Suzuka singles album
Suzuka OP ED Single - Start Line [COACH☆]
In addition to the two OSTs, King's Records has also included an album/CD for those who wish to sing karaoke to the music.  This album was released on August 13, 2005.

KICM-3110

Opening and ending themes
The anime version of Suzuka features pieces performed by COACH☆ as the Opening and theme songs.  
 Opening
 Start Line by COACH☆

 Closing
 Aoi FIELD by COACH☆ (1-14)
 Kimi no Koto (君のこと) by COACH☆ (15-26)

COACH☆
COACH☆ is a group made up of Ai Hayashi, Satomi Akesaka, Hatsumi Miura, Yumiko Hosono and Michie Kitaura.  Each member of COACH☆ also has a voice part in Suzuka, as follows:

Hatsumi Miura as Megumi Matsumoto, a college student with glasses who lives in Ayano’s dormitory and is Yuka's neighbor
Michie Kitaura as Nana Shirokawa, a popular singing idol and Honoka’s friend and mentor
Satomi Akesaka as Miho Fujikawa, Ayano's daughter and Yamato’s younger cousin by two years
Yumiko Hosono as Honoka Sakurai, a Shinto shrine maiden, Suzuka's classmate and Yamato's other love interest
Ai Hayashi as Rie Akitsuki, Yamato's younger sister who is still in Hiroshima

COACH☆ sings every vocal piece in Suzuka, which are Start Line, Aoi Field, Kimi no Koto, DREAM, 乙女座の恋, ゲッチュ!, ヤクソク, My Friend, あこがれ, and My Love.  Incidentally, My Love was the karaoke piece that Nana sings for the group in episode 17.

The only music video COACH☆ has ever released was of Start Line, included in a DVD that came with the first OST.

External links
 Suzuka OST 1 - CDJapan
 Suzuka OST 2 - CDJapan
 Suzuka OP ED - CDJapan
 COACH Main Page - Japanese

References 
 "cdJapan. Accessed 2007-03-16

Music
Anime soundtracks
Film and television discographies
Discographies of Japanese artists